Joseph Stanislaus Hansom, FRIBA (1845–1931) was a British architect. He was the son and partner of the better known Joseph Aloysius Hansom, inventor of the Hansom cab. He trained with his father, becoming his partner in 1869, and taking over the family practice fully in 1880. In 1881, he inherited the practice of John Crawley (1834–1881). In 1881, he designed Our Lady of Sorrows Church in Bognor Regis and extended St Mary Immaculate Church, Falmouth.

He was among the founders, in 1904, of the Catholic Record Society, and was so active on its behalf that Cardinal Gasquet described him as "its prime mover and energy."

References

1845 births
1931 deaths
Architects of Roman Catholic churches
Fellows of the Royal Institute of British Architects